Gerda Madsen (4 January 1902 – 26 July 1986) was a Danish film actress. She appeared in 26 films between 1921 and 1982. She was born and died in Denmark.

Selected filmography
 Häxan (1922)
 Kispus (1956)
 Be Dear to Me (1957)
 Skibet er ladet med (1960)
 Don Olsen kommer til byen (1964)
 Der var engang (1966)

References

External links

1902 births
1986 deaths
Danish film actresses
Danish silent film actresses
20th-century Danish actresses
Actresses from Copenhagen